The National Health Action Party (NHA) is a political party in the United Kingdom.

The party grew out of the movement opposing the 2012 Health and Social Care Act. It campaigns for renationalisation of the privatised parts of the English National Health Service, reductions in outsourcing, and improvements to NHS funding, service provision and staffing. Despite focusing on health, the party has a range of policies in areas such as the economy, housing and education. These include opposition to austerity and a call for political reform.

History 

The passage of the Health and Social Care Act in March 2012 prompted the party's co-founder Clive Peedell, a cancer specialist doctor, to co-write an open letter to The Independent alongside esteemed medical signatories. The letter was highly critical of the Liberal Democrats for their role in the passage of the Act and stated that the signatories would "form a coalition of healthcare professionals to take on coalition MPs at the next General Election, on the non-party, independent ticket of defending the NHS and acting in the wider public interest". Two months later, on 14 May 2012, Peedell co-founded the NHA Party with retired doctor Richard Taylor, who had twice been elected as MP for Wyre Forest on an 'independent health' component to his local hospital party name. The party was launched in Westminster in November 2012.

The party first stood in the 2013 Eastleigh by-election, with candidate Dr Iain Maclennan taking 392 votes. The party went on to stand in the 2014 European Parliament elections and the 2015 General Election, taking over 20,000 votes in each. This placed the party seventh in the popular vote in England in the latter. The party's best result to date was the 7,211 votes taken by Dr Richard Taylor in Wyre Forest in 2015 (he had been the MP from 2001 to 2010 under the label Independent Kidderminster Hospital and Health Concern).

Party co-founder Dr Clive Peedell resigned the leadership in July 2016, and Dr Paul Hobday was appointed as interim leader. Surgical registrar Dr Alex Ashman was elected as the new permanent party leader in December 2016 and promised to continue the work begun by Drs Peedell and Taylor. Dr Ashman resigned as leader in 2019 and was replaced by co-leaders Alastair Fischer and Veronika Wagner.

Supporters have included authors Mark Haddon and Philip Pullman, satirist Armando Iannucci, science writer Marcus Chown and comedian Rufus Hound. Hound stood as an NHA Party candidate in the London constituency for the 2014 European elections.

Policies 
The party has a range of policies on healthcare, political reform, the economy, immigration, housing, education and environmental sustainability.

Health 
 To reverse privatisation and restore a publicly run NHS that provides universal healthcare.
 To repeal the Health and Social Care Act 2012, remove the internal market and purchaser/provider split, and end use of Private Finance Initiative (PFI) deals.
 To protect the NHS from involvement in international trade agreements such as TTIP.
 To involve patients and staff in NHS decision processes and reduce reliance on management consultants.
 To improve public health, social care, housing and other matters that affect the nation's health.
 To combat gender inequality in healthcare and the workplace
 To demand a moratorium on hospital re-configurations unless there are evidence-based, clinical reasons with local and staff support and adequate alternatives already in place.

Political reform 
 To enact stricter controls on MPs' and Peers' voting when they have a conflict of interest.
 To reform the House of Lords so at least 80% of members are directly elected through single transferable vote, while the remainder are appointed for fixed terms based on expertise in specialist fields
 To review the system of party whips and the practice of voting without attending debate.
 To end the revolving door culture of UK politics.
 To lower the voting age to 16.
 To appoint a commission to investigate a move towards proportional representation.

Economy 
 To reject austerity and oppose further public spending cuts.
 To increase spending on key public services and infrastructure with a view to increasing the UK's GDP.
 To ensure taxation is progressive and take actions to reduce tax avoidance and evasion.
 To improve regulation of the financial sector, including separation of the retail and investment arms of banks.
 To introduce a living wage, ban zero-hour contracts and work towards a state of minimal unemployment.

Electoral performance

General election results

2015 general election 
The party stood 12 candidates in the 2015 general election. Targeted seats included those of leading proponents of the Health and Social Care Bill such as David Cameron and Jeremy Hunt. The candidates were:

Among the twelve candidates, the party won no seats and only saved two deposits (i.e. won more than 5%). Their best result came in Wyre Forest, where Dr Taylor (who had previously won the seat twice for the Independent Kidderminster Hospital and Health Concern party) came 4th with 14.6% of the vote. Dr Irvine came 4th with 8.5% in South West Surrey.

2017 general election 
The party stood five candidates at the 2017 general election. Food blogger and activist Jack Monroe was announced as the NHA Party candidate for Southend West, but withdrew due to ill health and receiving death threats. The candidates standing were:

Local election results

European Parliament election results

By-election results

See also
 Keep Our NHS Public

References

External links 

National Health Action Party official website
NHAspace Blog
Facebook
Twitter
YouTube channel
Related articles
The NHS is on a one-way road to privatisation. The Guardian. Published 2 October 2015. Retrieved 2 February 2017.
Surge in privatisation threatening free NHS treatment, unions say. The Guardian. Published 8 February 2016. Retrieved 2 February 2017.
NHS Reinstatement Bill: Tory MPs filibuster debate by talking about deporting foreigners for hours. The Independent. Published 11 March 2016. Retrieved 2 February 2017.
Creeping privatisation of healthcare is damaging the NHS, study finds. The Independent. Published 28 July 2016. Retrieved 2 February 2017.
Government quietly privatises the NHS's in-house agency staff provider. The Independent. Published 19 November 2016. Retrieved 2 February 2017.
NHS bosses 'spent half of extra Autumn Statement cash on outside services'. BBC News. Published 27 March 2017. Retrieved 25 April 2017.
Tory ‘Health Privatisation’ Under Fire £900m Spent On Non-NHS Treatments. Huffington Post (UK edition). Published 27 March 2017. Retrieved 25 April 2017.

Notes

 
2012 establishments in the United Kingdom
National Health Service (England)
Political parties established in 2012
Political parties in England
Anti-austerity political parties in the United Kingdom